Grand Prix motorcycle racing is the premier championship of motorcycle road racing, which has been divided into three classes since 1990; 125cc, 250cc and MotoGP. Former classes that are now discontinued include 350cc, 50cc and sidecars. The premier class is MotoGP, which was formerly known as the 500cc class. The Grand Prix Road-Racing World Championship was established in 1949 by the sport's governing body the Fédération Internationale de Motocyclisme (FIM), and is the oldest motorsport World Championship in existence. The motorcycles used in MotoGP are purpose-built for the sport, and are unavailable for purchase by the general public: they cannot be legally ridden on public roads.

Honda holds the record for the most Grand Prix victories on the premier class, having won 312 times. Yamaha is second with 245 wins, and MV Agusta is third with 139 wins.

By constructor

By nationality

References
General
 
 

Specific

Grand Prix motorcycle racing
500cc/MotoGP